Sinister commonly refers to:
 Evil
 Ominous

Sinister may also refer to:

Left side
 Sinister, Latin for the direction "left"
 Sinister, in heraldry, is the bearer's true left side (viewers' right side) of an escutcheon or coat of arms; see dexter and sinister
 Baton sinister, diminutive of the bend sinister
 Bend sinister, heraldic charge in heraldry, sometimes used to imply ancestral illegitimacy; see bend (heraldry)
 Sinister hand, left-handedness

People
 Sinister, a stagename of bassist Derrick Tribbett's

Arts, entertainment, and media

Fictional characters
 Mister Sinister, Marvel Comics supervillain
 Simon Bar Sinister, villain on the Underdog cartoon show
 Sinister Six, Marvel Comics supervillain group
 Sinister Twelve, Marvel Comics supervillain group

Films
 Sinister (film), a 2012 horror film starring Ethan Hawke
 Sinister 2, a 2015 supernatural horror film starring James Ransone

Literature
 Bend Sinister (novel), novel by Vladimir Nabokov
 The Sinister Signpost, Hardy Boys novel by Franklin W. Dixon

Music

Albums
 Bend Sinister (album), album by the band The Fall
 If You're Feeling Sinister, album by the band Belle & Sebastian
 If You're Feeling Sinister: Live at the Barbican, live album by Belle & Sebastian
 Sinister Slaughter, album by the band Macabre
 The Sinister Urge (album), album by Rob Zombie

Other music
 Sinister (band), from the Netherlands
 Sinister Footwear, orchestral ballet by Frank Zappa in three movements

Other arts, entertainment, and media
 Sinister Dexter, comic book
 Spider-Man: Return of the Sinister Six, comic-related video game

Other
Sinister Peak, North Cascades mountains, Washington state, U.S.

See also 
 Sinistar, a multi-directional shooter arcade game
 Sinistral, a scientific term
 Synyster Gates, guitarist
 The Sinister Minister (disambiguation)

nn:Sinister